The Chilliwack Bruins were a major junior ice hockey team in the Western Hockey League (WHL) based in Chilliwack, British Columbia, Canada. The 2006–07 season marked the Bruins' inaugural season in the WHL. The team played at Prospera Centre, which was expanded to 5,386 seats for the arrival of the team. The Bruins were sold after the 2010–11 season and subsequently relocated to Victoria to become the Victoria Royals.

History 
In 2005, the City of Chilliwack was granted a WHL expansion team after an attempt by the owners of the Tri-City Americans (Brian Burke, Glen Sather and Darryl Porter) to move the Americans to Chilliwack was voted down by the WHL directors. As a result, Burke, Sather and Porter sold their stake in the Americans and purchased the 21st franchise in the WHL. The arrival of the Bruins displaced the British Columbia Hockey League (BCHL)'s Chilliwack Chiefs, who relocated to Langley to become the Langley Chiefs. In early 2011, it became apparent to fans that they had been sold to RG Properties to allow them to move the team to Victoria. The previous ownership group of the original Chilliwack Chiefs franchise before 2006 had an offer of $7.75 million from the Chiefs development group, including Major League Baseball player Justin Morneau and National Hockey League player Willie Mitchell. This offer was rejected by both the majority ownership of the Bruins as well as the league.

The Bruins opened their inaugural season in 2006–07 at Prospera Centre on September 21, 2006, defeating the Kelowna Rockets by a score of 3–1. Keith Voytechek scored the first goal in franchise history, while Alex Archibald earned the first win by a Bruins goaltender. A month later, on October 28, Archibald became the first Bruins goaltender to record a shutout with a 3–0 win over the Tri-City Americans, which also established the first Bruins road win. Forward Josh Aspenlind established another Bruins first later in the season with the franchise's first hat-trick on February 23, 2007, against the Kamloops Blazers. General Manager Darrell May and the team's first head coach, Jim Hiller, helped the Bruins post an overall record of 25–40–5–2, the third-best overall record for a WHL expansion team, qualifying for the post-season. In the 2007 playoffs, the Bruins played the eventual Memorial Cup champion Vancouver Giants in the first round and lost the series four games to one.

Bruins forwards Mark Santorelli and Oscar Moller emerged in the team's second season in 2007–08, establishing team-highs in all statistical categories. Santorelli set team-highs with 74 assists and 101 points, earning the team's first major WHL trophy by leading the League in scoring, while Moller scored a franchise-high 39 goals.  The Bruins finished in seventh place in the Western Conference and lost to Vancouver in the first round. All games were decided by one goal.

After missing the playoffs in 2008–09, the Bruins fired head coach Jim Hiller. On June 3, 2009, the team named Marc Habscheid as the team's new head coach and general manager.

Season-by-season record 
Note: GP = Games played, W = Wins, L = Losses, OTL = Overtime losses, SOL = Shootout losses, GF = Goals for, GA = Goals against

Team records 

Full List of Team Records

NHL draftees
 Oscar Moller (Drafted by Los Angeles Kings in 2007; second round, 52nd overall)
 Mark Santorelli (Drafted by Nashville Predators in 2007; fourth round, 119th overall)
 Ryan Howse (Drafted by Calgary Flames in 2009; third round, 74th overall)
 Roman Horak (Drafted by New York Rangers in 2009; fifth round, 127th overall)
 Kevin Sundher (Drafted by Buffalo Sabres in 2010; third round, 75th overall)
 Tyler Stahl (Drafted by Carolina Hurricanes in 2010; sixth round, 167th overall)
 Dylen McKinlay (Drafted by Minnesota Wild in 2010; seventh round, 189th overall)

NHL alumni
Oscar Moller – Los Angeles Kings
Nick Holden – Columbus Blue Jackets, Colorado Avalanche, New York Rangers, Boston Bruins, Vegas Golden Knights, Ottawa Senators
Roman Horak – Calgary Flames, Edmonton Oilers
Brandon Manning – Philadelphia Flyers, Edmonton Oilers

See also
List of ice hockey teams in British Columbia

References

External links
 Western Hockey League official site

Defunct ice hockey teams in British Columbia
Sport in Chilliwack
Defunct Western Hockey League teams
Ice hockey clubs established in 2006
Sports clubs disestablished in 2011
2006 establishments in British Columbia
2011 disestablishments in British Columbia